Yuryuzan may refer to:
Yuryuzan (river), a river in Russia, left tributary of the Ufa
Yuryuzan, Chelyabinsk Oblast, a town in Chelyabinsk Oblast, Russia
Yuryuzan, Republic of Bashkortostan, a village in the Republic of Bashkortostan, Russia